Anzersky is one of the Solovetsky Islands.

References

Solovetsky Islands